Cerebratulus is a genus of nemerteans belonging to the family Lineidae.

The genus has cosmopolitan distribution.

Species

Species:

Cerebratulus acutus 
Cerebratulus lacteus 
Cerebratulus marginatus

References

Lineidae
Nemertea genera